Chen Ping may refer to:

Chen Ping (Han dynasty) (died 178 BC), minister during the reign of Emperor Gaozu of Han
Chen Ping (actress) (born 1948), Taiwanese actress
Chen Ping (Sun TV) (born 1955), chairman of Sun TV in Hong Kong

See also
Duke Ping of Chen (died 755 BC), ruler of the state of Chen
Chin Peng (1924–2013), Malaysian politician